Telegeodynamics is an electromechanical earth-resonance concept for underground seismic exploration proposed by Nikola Tesla.

Description
Tesla designed this system for use in prospecting and discerning the location of underground mineral structures through the transmission of mechanical energy through the subsurface.  Data from reflected and refracted signals can be analyzed to deduce the location and characteristics of underground formations.  Additional non-mechanical responses to the initial acoustic impulses may also be detectable using instruments that measure various electrical and magnetic parameters.  Such predicted responses would--at least--take the form of induced electric and magnetic fields, telluric currents, and changes in earth conductivity.

The electromechanical oscillator was originally designed as a source of isochronous (that is to say, frequency stable), alternating electric current used with both wireless transmitting and receiving apparatus.  In dynamical system theory an oscillator is called isochronous if the frequency is independent of its amplitude. An electromechanical device runs at the same rate regardless of changes in its drive force, so it maintains a constant frequency (hz).

See also 
 Surface waves and Shear waves
 Seismology

References

Further reading
 Journal Il Nuovo Cimento C, On a new general theory of earthquakes. Italian Physical Society, . Issue Volume 11, Number 2 / March, 1988  Pages 209-217 SpringerLink Date Thursday, February 08, 2007

Inventions by Nikola Tesla

it:Telegeodinamica